Cangombe is a town and commune of Angola, located in the province of Moxico, adjacent to the border with the Democratic Republic of the Congo.

See also 

 Communes of Angola

References 

Populated places in Moxico Province